Lori Von Linstruth is an American guitarist, lyricist and manager. She currently resides in the Netherlands where she lives with her partner and musical collaborator Arjen Anthony Lucassen. She is also his manager.

In addition, Linstruth is the webmaster of Lucassen's official website, a member of his band Guilt Machine (she wrote all the lyrics of their first album On This Perfect Day) and a former member of his former band Stream of Passion. She also co-wrote all the lyrics of the Ayreon album The Theory of Everything, again with Lucassen.

In 2010, Linstruth announced on her blog she was taking a "guitar sabbatical" to focus on other pursuits, such as dog-training, citing a loss of enthusiasm.

Personal life 
She currently resides in the Netherlands where she lives with her partner and musical collaborator Arjen Anthony Lucassen; she previously lived in Sweden. In a 2017 interview, Lucassen mentioned that, in addition to her work with him, she was also an English teacher.

Biography

Warbride
Linstruth first came to prominence in the late 1980s when she was featured in Mike Varney's "Spotlight" column in Guitar Player magazine. She moved from Santa Barbara to Los Angeles and, after a short stint in local band Jaded Lady, formed Warbride along with former Rude Girl drummer Sandy Sledge. Linstruth left Warbride in order to move to Sweden with her then husband and the band continued for a brief period with only one original member, keyboard player Velia Garay.

Linstruth attempted to reform the original Warbride in the early 2000 however, the project was put on hold when Linstruth became more involved in Arjen Anthony Lucassen's projects which led to her becoming a member of Stream of Passion.

Stream of Passion
Around 2004, Linstruth became involved in Arjen Anthony Lucassen's side-project Stream of Passion, touring extensively in 2006 and 2007. Lucassen had discovered her via a video on her website invited her over to his studio to see if some sort of co-operation was possible. He asked her to record some guitar parts for the re-release of his Ayreon album The Final Experiment and liked it, as the result invited her to join Stream of Passion.

Linstruth decided to leave the band in March 2007, following the departure of Lucassen.

Other projects
In 2006 Linstruth contributed with two solos on the tribute-project Mountain of Power, led by guitarist Janne Stark.

By late 2007, Lori left Sweden and headed for the Netherlands where she became Lucassen's manager.

In February 2009, it was announced that Linstruth would contribute to Lucassen's latest project, Guilt Machine, as a guitarist and lyricist.

In 2010 Linstruth announced in her blog that she had lost her passion of playing guitar and instead would concentrate on dog training.

Musical style
While Linstruth herself promotes Rammstein as one of her main influences, she is also known to be influenced by Uli Jon Roth, Michael Schenker and Yngwie J. Malmsteen.

She uses wah and tremolo effects extensively.

Discography

Solo 
 Lori Linstruth Demo (2004)

Guilt Machine 
 On This Perfect Day (2009)

Stream of Passion 
 Embrace the Storm (2005)
 Live in the Real World (2006)

As guest 
 Mountain of Power - guest solos on "Out of the Darkness" and "Mountain of Power" (an instrumental track)
 Ayreon - 01011001 (2008)
 Ayreon - The Final Experiment (2005 bonus disc)

Other 
 Star One - Victims of the Modern Age (2010) - manager, filming and editing of "The Making of Victims of the Modern Age"
 Arjen Anthony Lucassen - Lost in the New Real (2012) - Photography, creative consultant
 Ayreon - The Theory of Everything (2013) - lyrics, photography
 The Gentle Storm - The Diary (2015) - creative consultant
 Ayreon - The Theater Equation (2016) - photography, video editor
 Ayreon - The Source (2017) - creative consultant, filming and editing of "Behind the Scenes" and "Interviews" for bonus DVD, manager

See also 
 Arjen Anthony Lucassen
 Stream of Passion
 Guilt Machine

References

External links 
 Play like a girl (Lori's music-teaching website)
 Lori's homepage
 Warbride's current homepage
 Stream of Passion's Home Page
 Ragnarok Radio Interview with Lori Linstruth and Floor Jansen (December 2008)

American women guitarists
American heavy metal guitarists
Lead guitarists
Living people
Year of birth missing (living people)
Stream of Passion members
21st-century American women